James Rajotte (born August 19, 1970) is a Canadian politician who currently serves as Alberta's senior representative to the United States. He served as a Member of Parliament from 2004 to 2015.

As a member of the Conservative Party of Canada in the House of Commons of Canada, Rajotte was chair of Parliament's Standing Committee on Finance. Previously he was chair of the Standing Committee on Industry, Science and Technology. He represented the riding of Edmonton Southwest from 2000 to 2004. In the 2004 federal election he was elected in the newly created riding of Edmonton-Leduc. He was re-elected in Edmonton-Leduc in the 2006 and 2008 federal elections. He was first elected as a Canadian Alliance MP in 2000, and was also one of four Alliance MPs who agreed to sit with the Progressive Conservative caucus after the December 9, 2003 creation of the Conservative Party, as the Alliance and Progressive Conservative parliamentary caucuses were not officially merged into a single caucus until a few weeks later.

Rajotte is a former executive assistant and researcher.  Rajotte was the CPC official opposition critic for Industry and also fulfilled the role of opposition critic for Science, Research and Development. His interests include classical music and literature.

Electoral record

|-

|- bgcolor="white"
!align="right" colspan=3|Total valid votes
!align="right"|48,670
!align="right"|100.00%
!align="right"|
!align="right"|
|- bgcolor="white"
!align="right" colspan=3|Total rejected ballots
!align="right"|111
!align="right"|0.23%
!align="right"|
!align="right"|
|- bgcolor="white"
!align="right" colspan=3|Turnout
!align="right"|48,781
!align="right"|65.08%
!align="right"|
!align="right"|

Other political offices

References

External links

[www.jamesrajottemp.ca/ Link to official website]

1970 births
Canadian Alliance MPs
Conservative Party of Canada MPs
Living people
Members of the House of Commons of Canada from Alberta
Politicians from Edmonton
21st-century Canadian politicians